Natasha Friend (born April 28, 1972 in Norwich, New York) is an American author. Her first three books are the award-winning, young adult novels Perfect, Lush, and Bounce.

Early life and education
Friend was born in a town in upstate New York, to an English professor father and poet/actress mother. She began writing books at the age of nine.

In 1994, Friend received a B.A. in Psychology from Bates College in Lewiston, Maine. She earned her M.A. in English at Clemson University.

She has taught at the Brearley School in New York City, and Ecole Bilingue-International School in Cambridge, Massachusetts. Friend also served as director of the Brimmer and May Summer Camp in Chestnut Hill, Massachusetts.

Writing career
Friend's writing has appeared in Family Fun magazine and the book Chicken Soup for the Volunteer's Soul. In 2004, her first book, the young adult fiction novel Perfect, won the Milkweed Prize for Children’s Literature.

Books
2004 - Perfect — Milkweed Editions
2006 - Lush — Scholastic Corporation
2009 - Bounce — Scholastic Corporation
2010 - For Keeps
2012 - My Life in Black and White
2016 - Where You'll Find Me
2017 - The Other F-Word
2018 - How We Roll

Awards
PERFECT
 Isinglass Teen Book Award, 2008
 Golden Sower Award, 2007
 Black-Eyed Susan Award nominee, 2007-2008
 Book Sense Pick, 2006
 Milkweed Prize for Children's Literature, 2004

LUSH 
 Rhode Island Teen Book Award, 2008
A.L.A. Quick Pick for Reluctant Readers, 2006

BOUNCE
 One of NYPL's Best Books for the Teen Age, 2002
For Keeps- Parper Back 2019

References

External links
Natasha Friend's Official Website

1972 births
21st-century American novelists
American women novelists
Bates College alumni
Clemson University alumni
Living people
People from Norwich, New York
American writers of young adult literature
21st-century American women writers
Women writers of young adult literature
Novelists from New York (state)